Miasmata is an album by Vas Deferens Organization and Christopher Moock, released in 1996 through Womb Tunes.

Track listing

Personnel 
Adapted from the Miasmata liner notes.
Musicians
Matt Castille – instruments, production, recording
Eric Lumbleau – instruments
Christopher Moock – instruments, production, recording
Production and additional personnel
Christy Castille-Wittman – cover art

Release history

References 

1996 albums
Vas Deferens Organization albums